Ajay Raaj is an Indian actor and choreographer who appears in Tamil language films. While working as a dance choreographer, Ajay made his acting debut with Agathiyan's Selvam (2005), before appearing in Chennai 600028 (2007) and has since appeared regularly in films associated with director Venkat Prabhu and his team.

Career
While working as a dance choreographer, Ajay made his acting debut with Agathiyan's Selvam (2005) portraying a friend of the lead character played by Nandha. His friendship with Venkat Prabhu meant that he was cast in Chennai 600028 (2007) portraying an ambulance driver, who plays gully cricket for the Sharks team. He has since appeared regularly in films associated with director Venkat Prabhu and his team such as Saroja (2008) and Thozha (2008). Ajay Raaj also had a supporting role in Thiagarajan Kumararaja's neo-noir gangster film Aaranya Kaandam (2010), portraying a henchman of the gangster played by Jackie Shroff.

In 2016, actor Nithin Sathya announced that Ajay Raaj would play the lead role in his first film as a producer.

Filmography

Actor

Choreographer

 1998 Kadhal Mannan
 1999 Amarkalam
 1999 Hello
 1999 Taj Mahal
 2000 Unnai Kodu Ennai Tharuven
 2000 Appu
 2000 Parthen Rasithen
 2001 Kadal Pookkal
 2002 Jjunction
 2002 Naina
 2002 Thamizh
 2002 Vivaramana Aalu
 2002 Gummalam
 2003 University
 2003 Kaiyodu Kai
 2003 Pallavan
 2004 Jathi
 2004 Campus
 2005 Sukran
 2005 Selvam
 2005 Mazhai
 2006 Kovai Brothers
 2007 Chennai 600028
 2008 Sadhu Miranda
 2008 Thozha
 2008 Vellithirai
 2009 Siva Manasula Sakthi
 2009 Kunguma Poovum Konjum Puravum
 2010 Goa
 2010 Naanayam
 2010 Baana Kaathadi
 2011 Mankatha
 2013 Biriyani
 2014 Sri Ramanujar
 2014 Sigaram Thodu
 2014 Theriyama Unna Kadhalichitten
 2015 Mahabalipuram
 2015 India Pakistan
 2015 Massu Engira Masilamani
 2015 Maanga
 2015 Om Shanthi Om
 2016 Kadhal Kaalam
 2016 Chennai 600028 II: Second Innings
 2017 Kaadhal Kaalam
 2018 Jarugandi
 2019 Party

References

External links 

 
Male actors in Tamil cinema
21st-century Indian male actors
Male actors from Chennai
Indian film choreographers
1982 births
Living people